Andrea La Mantia (born 6 May 1991) is an Italian professional footballer who plays as a forward for  club SPAL, on loan from Empoli.

Club career
He made his professional debut in the Serie B for Frosinone on 28 November 2009 in a game against AlbinoLeffe.

On 11 January 2020 he joined Empoli on loan with an obligation to buy.

On 19 July 2022, La Mantia moved to SPAL on loan with a conditional obligation to buy.

References

External links
 

Living people
Sportspeople from the Metropolitan City of Rome Capital
1991 births
People from Marino, Lazio
Footballers from Lazio
Association football forwards
Italian footballers
Frosinone Calcio players
A.S.D. Città di Foligno 1928 players
S.S. Fidelis Andria 1928 players
A.S.D. Barletta 1922 players
A.S.D. Victor San Marino players
Cosenza Calcio players
F.C. Pro Vercelli 1892 players
U.S. Lecce players
Virtus Entella players
Empoli F.C. players
S.P.A.L. players
Serie A players
Serie B players
Serie C players
Serie D players
People of Sicilian descent